Monopenchelys acuta, the redface moray or redface eel, is a species of saltwater eel, the only member of the genus Monopenchelys of the Muraenidae (Moray eel) family.  It is found in the Atlantic, the eastern Pacific, and the western Indian Ocean. Its length is up to 209 mm.

References

Muraenidae
Monotypic fish genera